Zhao Jun is the name of:

Zhao Jun (diplomat) (born 1954), Chinese diplomat
Zhao Jun (chess player) (born 1986), Chinese chess player
Zhao Jun (footballer, born 1988), Chinese association footballer
Zhao Jun (footballer, born 1997), Chinese association footballer
Zhao Jun (skier) (born 1967), Chinese Olympic skier